Micatocomus is a genus of longhorn beetles of the subfamily Lamiinae.

 Micatocomus isomeroides Galileo & Martins, 1988
 Micatocomus petalacmoides Galileo & Martins, 1988

References

Calliini